The Troubled Month of Veresen is a 1977 Soviet war drama directed by Leonid Osyka.

See also 
Zakhar Berkut (1971) - other works of Leonid Osyka
Kaminnyi khrest (1968)

References

External links 
 

Dovzhenko Film Studios films
1970s war drama films
Soviet war drama films
Russian-language Ukrainian films
Ukrainian war drama films
1977 drama films
1977 films
Soviet World War II films
Ukrainian World War II films